60S ribosomal protein L7 is a protein that in humans is encoded by the RPL7 gene.

Function 

Ribosomes, the organelles that catalyze protein synthesis, consist of a small 40S subunit and a large 60S subunit. Together these subunits are composed of 4 RNA species and approximately 80 structurally distinct proteins. This gene encodes a ribosomal protein that is a component of the 60S subunit. The protein belongs to the L30P family of ribosomal proteins. It contains an N-terminal basic region-leucine zipper (BZIP)-like domain and the RNP consensus sub-motif RNP2. In vitro the BZIP-like domain mediates homodimerization and stable binding to DNA and RNA, with a preference for 28S rRNA and mRNA. The protein can inhibit cell-free translation of mRNAs, suggesting that it plays a regulatory role in the translation apparatus. It is located in the cytoplasm. The protein has been shown to be an autoantigen in patients with systemic autoimmune diseases, such as systemic lupus erythematosus. As is typical for genes encoding ribosomal proteins, there are multiple processed pseudogenes of this gene dispersed through the genome.

Interactions 

RPL7 has been shown to interact with ZNF7. It interacts with HIV-1 Gag protein through Zinc Finger of HIV-1 Gag.

References

Further reading 

 
 
 
 
 
 
 
 
 
 
 
 
 
 
 

Ribosomal proteins